Craig Barry Shipley (born 7 January 1963) is an Australian-born executive and former player in Major League Baseball.  On 16 November 2012, he was appointed special assistant to Arizona Diamondbacks general manager Kevin Towers.

Shipley was born and raised in Australia, attended Epping Boys High School in New South Wales and learned to play baseball from his father, Barry. He played college baseball at Alabama as a shortstop.

As a player, he was an infielder for the Los Angeles Dodgers (1986–87), New York Mets (1989), San Diego Padres (1991–94 and 1996–97), Houston Astros (1995) and Anaheim Angels (1998). He played collegiately at the University of Alabama.

Shipley began switch-hitting in college at the suggestion of his coaches. Before the start of the 1986 season, after struggling offensively for two seasons in the minors, he reverted to batting exclusively from the right side of the plate.

He helped the Padres win the  National League Western Division championship, appearing in 33 games played – 21 after 31 July – and batting .315 with 29 hits, five doubles, one home run, seven runs batted in and seven stolen bases. In the field, he started at four different defensive positions: second base, third base, shortstop and right field. However, he did not appear in the postseason.

In 11 seasons, Shipley played in 582 games and had 1,345 at bats, 155 runs scored, 364 hits, 63 doubles, six triples, 20 home runs, 138 RBI, 33 stolen bases, 47 bases on balls, a .271 batting average, .302 on-base percentage, .371 slugging percentage, 499 total bases, 15 sacrifice hits, nine sacrifice flies and 7 intentional walks.

He then returned to the Padres as a professional scout, working for Towers, in –.

In , Shipley followed former Padres executives Larry Lucchino and Theo Epstein to the Boston Red Sox, where he began as special assistant to the general manager, player development and international scouting. In February 2011, Shipley was promoted again, when he was named senior vice president, player personnel and international scouting. However, weeks after Epstein departed the Red Sox for the Chicago Cubs in October 2011, Shipley was dismissed in an overhaul of the Boston front office under the team's new general manager, Ben Cherington.

In 2012, Shipley was hired by the Arizona Diamondbacks as an assistant to general manager Kevin Towers. , he is still part of the Diamondbacks front office, assisting "the Baseball Operations Department in international and special assignment scouting, evaluating the D-backs' farm system and serving as an advisor to the GM."

See also
List of players from Australia in Major League Baseball

References

External links

1963 births
Living people
Alabama Crimson Tide baseball players
Albuquerque Dukes players
Anaheim Angels players
Arizona Diamondbacks executives
Arizona League Padres players
Australian expatriate baseball players in the United States
Boston Red Sox executives
Houston Astros players
Jackson Mets players
Las Vegas Stars (baseball) players
Los Angeles Dodgers players
Major League Baseball players from Australia
Major League Baseball shortstops
Major League Baseball third basemen
New York Mets players
People educated at Epping Boys High School
San Antonio Dodgers players
San Diego Padres players
San Diego Padres scouts
Tidewater Tides players
Vero Beach Dodgers players